The Cream City Brewing Company was an American brewery that was located in Milwaukee, Wisconsin from 1853 until 1937. The brewery was one of seven to survive Prohibition in the city. One structure remains from the old brewery complex; a 25,000 square-foot horse stable  built  in  1910  that housed over forty  horses  to  pull  beer wagons.

History

The brewery was built in 1853 by George and Conrad Weir. It was called West Hill Brewery at the time and was owned by George Weir and Christopher Forster. Ownership of the brewery changed several times until John Beck bought out his partner Stephen Weber in 1861, and retained ownership until 1877 when it was sold to Jacob Veldt. Two years later it was sold to William Gerlach who renamed the brewery Cream City Brewing Company. During the 19th century, the brewery was emerging as a significant player in the Milwaukee beer market. In the 1880s, the facility produced 25,000 barrels of beer annually. The company was able to survive Prohibition by selling near beer. However, due to debt problems, the company was foreclosed by creditors in 1937.

Brands

 Big Boy Beer
 Blue Jay Beer
 Bock Beer
 Cream City Draft Beer
 Cream City Export Beer
 Cream City Pale Beer
 Cream City Pelham Club Beer
 Cream City Pilsener Beer
 Extra Stock Dark Beer
 Hanover Dark Beer
 Pelham Club Extra Brew Pale Beer
 Pilsener Beer

See also
 Beer in Milwaukee
 List of defunct breweries in the United States

References

American companies established in 1853
1853 establishments in Wisconsin
Defunct brewery companies of the United States
Companies based in Milwaukee